On the Bus with Rosa Parks is a book of poems by Rita Dove. Rosa Parks was an American activist in the civil rights movement best known for her pivotal role in the Montgomery bus boycott. The United States Congress has called her "the first lady of civil rights" and "the mother of the freedom movement".

The book contains a poem about Claudette Colvin, a high school student who was arrested in Montgomery, Alabama, nine months before Parks for refusing to give up her seat on a city bus.

Contents
July, 1925 
Night 
Birth 
Lake Erie skyline, 1930 
Depression years 
Homework 
Graduation, grammar school 
Painting the town 
Easter Sunday, 1940 
Nightwatch. The son 
Singsong 
I cut my finger once on purpose 
Parlor 
The first book 
Maple Valley Branch Library, 1967 
Freedom: bird's-eye view 
Testimonial 
Dawn revisited 
My mother enters the work force 
Black on a Saturday night 
The musician talks about "process" 
Sunday 
The camel comes to us from the barbarians 
The Venus of Willendorf 
Incarnation in Phoenix 
Best Western Motor Lodge, AAA approved 
Revenant 
On Veronica 
There came a soul 
The peach orchard 
Against repose Against self-pity 
Götterdämmerung 
Ghost walk 
Lady Freedom among us 
For Sophie, who'll be in first grade in the year 2000 
Sit back, relax 
"The situation is intolerable" 
Freedom ride 
Climbing in 
Claudette Colvin goes to work 
The enactment 
Rosa 
QE2. Transatlantic crossing. Third Day. 
In the lobby of the Warner Theatre, Washington, D.C. 
The pond, porch-view: six P.M., early spring.

References

External links
Rita Dove, On the Bus with Rosa Parks, interview 

American poetry collections
1999 poetry books
W. W. Norton & Company books